National Highway 20 (NH 20) is a  National Highway in India. This highway originates from Bakhtiyarpur in Bihar and terminates at Satabhaya in Odisha.

Route 

Bihar - Bakhtiyarpur - Bihar Sharif, Nawada, Rajauli 

Jharkhand - Kodarma, Barhi, Padma, Hazaribag, Charhi, Kuju, Ramgarh, Ormanjhi, Irba, Mesra, Ranchi, Khunti, Murhu, Chakradharpur, Chaibasa, Jaintgarh   

Odisha - Parsora, Kendujhargarh, Panikoili, Kuakhia, Jajpur, Aradi, Chandabali, Raj Kanika and terminating at Satabhaya.

References

External links
NH 20 on OpenStreetMap

National highways in India
National Highways in Bihar
National Highways in Jharkhand
National Highways in Odisha